The Politically Incorrect Guide to Capitalism is a 2007 book by Austrian school economist Robert P. Murphy. It is the ninth book in the Regnery Publishing The Politically Incorrect Guides (P.I.G.) series.

Written as a result of a poll by P.I.G. readers that stated a book on economics, The Politically Incorrect Guide to Capitalism aims to refute what it sees as common misconceptions resulting from Keynesian economics about what capitalism actually is.

The Politically Incorrect Guide to Capitalism argues against criticisms of capitalism, amongst which are:
 it causes ecological destruction
 it causes vast income inequality, as well as racism
 it causes an unpredictable boom and bust cycle

Instead, Murphy argues that they result from government efforts to regulate the free market that have the effect of distorting laissez-faire supply and demand that would encourage the most rational allocation of resources possible, as well as their conservation for future generations. For example, with endangered species such as rhinos it is argued that if they were freely traded those who used their parts would have a stake in maintaining supply and conservation would improve (page 49). It is likewise argued that antitrust laws are unnecessary and that the "robber barons" actually benefited the US' poor much more than any government aid has ever done.

Notes and references

Further reading
 
 

2007 non-fiction books
American non-fiction books
Austrian School publications
Books about capitalism
English-language books
Libertarian books
Politically Incorrect Guides
Regnery Publishing books